The 1968 Peruvian coup d'état took place during the first presidency of Fernando Belaúnde (1963–1968), as a result of political disputes becoming norms, serious arguments between President Belaúnde and Congress rising, dominated by the APRA-UNO (Unión Nacional Odríista) coalition, and even clashes between the President and his own Acción Popular (Popular Action) party were common. Congress went on to censor several cabinets of the Belaúnde administration, and a general political instability was perceived. General Juan Velasco Alvarado led the coup.

Context 
A dispute with the International Petroleum Company over licenses to the  oil fields in Talara Province, northern Peru sparked a national scandal when a key page of a contract (the 11th) was found missing. The Armed Forces, fearing that this scandal might lead to another uprising or a takeover from the APRA party, seized absolute power and closed down Congress, almost all of whose members were briefly incarcerated. General Velasco seized power on October 3, 1968, in a bloodless military coup, deposing the democratically elected administration of Fernando Belaúnde, under which he served as Commander of the Armed Forces. President Belaúnde was sent into exile. Initial reaction against the coup evaporated after five days when on October 8, 1968, the oil fields in dispute were taken over by the Army.

Coup d'état 
At 1:00 AM on Thursday of October 3, 1968, an armored squadron of tanks went from the Tank Division towards the Presidential Palace in the capital city of Lima, along with support from the armed forces. The intention was to avoid confrontation with the palace guards with an early attack.

Although rumors of a coup and of a possible overthrow circulated around the Council of Ministers and Presidential Cabinet, no special measures were taken in the event of defending the palace from mutiny.

Additionally, due to the early timing, the chief military aide to President Belaúnde was still sleeping at his home away from the Presidential Palace, and the Presidential Guards immediately surrendered at the sight of the armored squadron at the steps of the pavilion.

At 2 AM, President Belaúnde was woken up and dragged out of his bed in his pajamas by Velasco-Alvarado and his militants. Belaúnde offered no resistance. Close advisers to Belaúnde also reportedly saw him as drugged the night before the coup, presumably by traitors in the presidential residence itself.

Ousting of Belaúnde-Terry 

After hearing a barrage of bullets outside the palace in the morning, Belaúnde found himself alone in the Presidential Palace along with a couple of other family members and ministers.

In the morning, a group of officers found Belaunde and informed him of his arrest at gunpoint. Belaúnde, furious, exclaimed "Identify yourself, you miserable traitor. You are talking to the Constitutional President of the Republic!" The group backed, and Colonel Enrique Gallegos explained Velasco's orders for his deportation to him.

Belaúnde responded "You sons of...traitors...unworthy of the uniform that the country has entrusted to you. You are dismissed! Bringing so many tanks and guns just to detain an unarmed man! Shoot me then, damn it!"

President Belaúnde attempted to resist the arrest. Four officers threw themselves on President Belaúnde, taking him by the arms, and held him back. He was then detained.

Following the coup d'état, at 7 AM, Belaúnde was taken to a barracks and was forcibly taken to Jorge Chavez International Airport in Callao, Peru. Velasco, having assumed authority, immediately ordered Belaúnde to be deported, and ordered an ASPA (a privately owned international Peruvian airline) jet on the runway of the airport.

Belaúnde was forced into the jet, and the exiled president was deported to Argentina. Belaúnde would spend the next years of Velasco's regime in both Argentina and the United States as a professor.

Council of Ministers 
The President of the Council of Ministers, as well as many other Ministers, were rushed at their homes and the presidential palace. They immediately surrendered.

Prior to being attacked and hearing of Belaúnde's arrest, the President of the Council of Ministers attempted to establish order by calling an emergency Cabinet meeting to swear in the Vice President, Mario Polar. Only three ministers attended, but the Vice President was also detained by the insurgents.

Further reading 

 Cynthia McClintock and Abraham Lowenthal, eds., The Peruvian Experiment Reconsidered (Princeton, 1983)
 George Philip, The Rise and Fall of the Peruvian Military Radicals, 1968–1976 (London, 1978)
 Juan Martín Sánchez, La Revolución Peruana: Ideología y Práctica Política de un Gobierno Militar, 1968–1975 (Sevilla, 2002)
 Ernest Preeg, The Evolution of a Revolution: Peru and its Relations with the United States, 1968–1980 (Washington, DC, 1981)
 Dirk Kruijt, Revolution by Decree: Peru, 1968–1975 (Amsterdam, 1994)
 Sharp, Daniel A. (1972). U.S. Foreign Policy and Peru. University of Texas Press.

References 

1968 in Peru
History of Peru
Peruvian Army
October 1968 events in South America
1960s coups d'état and coup attempts
Conflicts in 1968
1968 in politics
History of Lima
Military coups in Peru
Revolutionary Government of the Armed Forces of Peru